Beverly P. Lynch (born December 27, 1936) is a librarian and a former president of the American Library Association.

Education 
She earned a Bachelor of Science degree with majors in English and music from North Dakota State University, a Masters of Science degree in library sciences from the University of Illinois at Urbana–Champaign, and a Ph.D. from the University of Wisconsin–Madison.

Career 
She was the university librarian at the University of Illinois at Chicago from 1977 to 1989.  She later became dean of the University of California Los Angeles's (UCLA) School of Library and Information Science.

She served as president of the American Library Association from 1985 to 1986.

Awards
In 1987, she was honored as a distinguished alumna by the University of Illinois Urbana-Champaign.  She received a similar honor in 2009 from the University of Wisconsin at Madison.

She was awarded the Melvil Dewey Medal from the American Library Association in 2012.

References

Presidents of the American Library Association
North Dakota State University alumni
University of Illinois School of Information Sciences alumni
University of Illinois Chicago faculty
University of Wisconsin–Madison alumni
1936 births
Living people